Sakshi or Saakshi may refer to:
 Sakshi (witness), a concept in Hindu philosophy
 Sakshi (film), a 1967 Telugu film
 Saaksshi, 2004 Indian television series
 Sakshi (novel), a 1986 Kannada novel by S. L. Bhyrappa
 Sakshi (newspaper), a Telugu daily based in Hyderabad, India
 Sakshi TV, a Telugu news channel
 Sakshi (media group), holding company of Sakshi newspaper and Sakshi TV
 Sakshigopal Temple, a temple dedicated to Lord Gopal located in Sakshigopal, Orissa

People
 Sakshi Chaudhary (born 1993), Indian model and actress
 Sakshi Maharaj (born 1956), Indian politician from Uttar Pradesh
 Sakshi Malik (born 1992), Indian wrestler
 Sakshi Ranga Rao (1942–2005), Indian actor in Telugu films
 Sakshi Shivanand (born 1977), Indian actress in Telugu, Tamil, Kannada, Malayalam, and Hindi films
 Saakshi Siva (born 1972), Indian actor in Tamil and Telugu television serials
 Sakshi Tanwar (born 1973), Indian actress

See also
 Agni Sakshi (disambiguation)